Liu Zhen  is the name of:

Liu Zhen (Han dynasty) ( 2nd century BC), Han dynasty marquis and son of Liu Sheng, Prince of Zhongshan
Liu Zhen (Tang dynasty) (died 844), Tang dynasty rebel
Liu Zhen (PRC) (1915–1992), Chinese Communist general 
Liu Zhen (rower) (born 1982), Chinese rower
Serena Liu (1975–2020), or Liu Zhen, Taiwanese dancer and actress